In the mathematical theory of probability, the Hsu–Robbins–Erdős theorem states that if  is a sequence of i.i.d. random variables with zero mean and finite variance and

 

then

 

for every .

The result was proved by Pao-Lu Hsu and Herbert Robbins in 1947.

This is an interesting strengthening of the classical strong law of large numbers in the direction of the Borel–Cantelli lemma. The idea of such a result is probably due to Robbins, but the method of proof is vintage Hsu. Two years later, the famed mathematician Paul Erdős proved the conjecture.

Since then, many authors extended this result in several directions.

References

Theorems in measure theory
Probabilistic inequalities